Trinocular vision may refer to:

 Animals with a rudimentary third eye:
 The parietal eye present in some amphibians and reptiles.
 The ocelli that occur in many arthropods.
 A compound eye with three independent regions, such as that of the mantis shrimp.

See also 
 Third eye (disambiguation)
 Binocular vision
 Monocular vision